Hibernia is an unincorporated community located along County Route 513 (Green Pond Road) in Rockaway Township of Morris County, New Jersey. The area is served as United States Postal Service ZIP code 07842. The community takes its name from Hibernia, the classical name for Ireland.

As of the 2000 United States Census, the population for ZIP Code Tabulation Area 07842 was 93.

The Hibernia mines, a series of iron mines worked from pre-Revolutionary times until 1916, are located here.

Since 1970, the former Methodist Episcopal Church on Green Pond Road has been used as a branch of the Rockaway Township Free Public Library.

Demographics

Notable people 

 Thomas J. Hillery (1871–1920), President of the New Jersey Senate

References

External links
 
 
Census 2000 Fact Sheet for ZIP Code Tabulation Area 07842 from the United States Census Bureau

Rockaway Township, New Jersey
Unincorporated communities in Morris County, New Jersey
Unincorporated communities in New Jersey